A macron is a diacritical mark: it is a straight bar  placed above a letter, usually a vowel. Its name derives from Ancient Greek  (makrón) "long", since it was originally used to mark long or heavy syllables in Greco-Roman metrics. It now more often marks a long vowel. In the International Phonetic Alphabet, the macron is used to indicate a mid-tone; the sign for a long vowel is instead a modified triangular colon .

The opposite is the breve , which marks a short or light syllable or a short vowel.

Uses

Syllable weight
In Greco-Roman metrics and in the description of the metrics of other literatures, the macron was introduced and is still widely used in dictionaries and educational materials to mark a long (heavy) syllable. Even relatively recent classical Greek and Latin dictionaries are still concerned with indicating only the length (weight) of syllables; that is why most still do not indicate the length of vowels in syllables that are otherwise metrically determined. Many textbooks about Ancient Rome and Greece use the macron, even if it was not actually used at that time (an apex was used if vowel length was marked in Latin).

Vowel length
The following languages or transliteration systems use the macron to mark long vowels:

 Slavicists use the macron to indicate a non-tonic long vowel, or a non-tonic syllabic liquid, such as on l, lj, m, n, nj, and r. Languages with this feature include standard and dialect varieties of Serbo-Croatian, Slovene, and Bulgarian.
Thus the Arabic word  (three) is transliterated thalāthah.
Transcriptions of Sanskrit typically use a macron over ā, ī, ū, ṝ, and ḹ in order to mark a long vowel (e and o are always long and consequently do not need any macron).
 In Latin, many of the more recent dictionaries and learning materials use the macron as the modern equivalent of the ancient Roman apex to mark long vowels. Any of the six vowel letters (ā, ē, ī, ō, ū, ȳ) can bear it. However, the older of these editions are not always explicit on whether they mark long vowels or heavy syllables – a confusion that is even found in some modern learning materials. In addition, most of the newest academic publications use both the macron and the breve sparingly, mainly when vowel length is relevant to the discussion.
In romanization of classical Greek, the letters η (eta) and ω (omega) are transliterated, respectively, as ē and ō, representing the long vowels of classical Greek, whereas the short vowels ε (epsilon) and ο (omicron) are always transliterated as plain e and o. The other long vowel phonemes don't have dedicated letters in the Greek alphabet, being indicated by digraphs (transliterated likewise as digraphs) or by the letters α, ι , υ – represented as ā, ī, ū. The same three letters are transliterated as plain a, i, u when representing short vowels.
 The Hepburn romanization system of Japanese, for example, kōtsū "traffic" as opposed to kotsu "bone" or "knack".
 Baltic languages and Baltic-Finnic languages:
 Latvian. ā, ē, ī, ū are separate letters but are given the same position in collation as a, e, i, u respectively. Ō was also used in Latvian, but it was discarded as of 1946. Some usage remains in Latgalian.
 Lithuanian. ū is a separate letter but is given the same position in collation as the unaccented u. It marks a long vowel; other long vowels are indicated with an ogonek (which used to indicate nasalization, but it no longer does): ą, ę, į, ų and o being always long in Lithuanian except for some recent loanwords. For the long counterpart of i, y is used.
 Livonian. ā, ǟ, ē, ī, ō, ȱ, ȭ and ū are separate letters that sort in alphabetical order immediately after a, ä, e, i, o, ȯ, õ, and u, respectively.
 Samogitian. ā, ē, ė̄, ī, ū and ō are separate letters that sort in alphabetical order immediately after a, e, ė, i, u and o respectively.
 Transcriptions of Nahuatl, the Aztecs' language, spoken in Mexico. When the Spanish conquistadors arrived, they wrote the language in their own alphabet without distinguishing long vowels. Over a century later, in 1645, Horacio Carochi defined macrons to mark long vowels ā, ē, ī and ō, and short vowels with grave (`) accents. This is rare nowadays since many people write Nahuatl without any orthographic sign and with the letters k, s and w, not present in the original alphabet.
 Modern transcriptions of Old English, for long vowels.
 Latin transliteration of Pali and Sanskrit, and in the IAST and ISO 15919 transcriptions of Indo-Aryan and Dravidian languages.
 Polynesian languages:
Cook Islands Māori. In Cook Islands Māori, the macron or mākarōna is not commonly used in writing, but is used in references and teaching materials for those learning the language.
  Hawaiian. The macron is called kahakō, and it indicates vowel length, which changes meaning and the placement of stress.
Māori. In modern written Māori, the macron is used to designate long vowels, with the trema mark sometimes used if the macron is unavailable (e.g. "Mäori"). The Māori word for macron is tohutō. The term pōtae ("hat") is also used. In the past, writing in Māori either did not distinguish vowel length, or doubled long vowels (e.g. "Maaori"), as some iwi dialects still do.
 Niuean. In Niuean, "popular spelling" does not worry too much about vowel quantity (length), so the macron is primarily used in scholarly study of the language.
 Tahitian. The use of the macron is comparatively recent in Tahitian. The Fare Vānaa or Académie Tahitienne (Tahitian Academy) recommends using the macron, called the tārava, to represent long vowels in written text, especially for scientific or teaching texts and it has widespread acceptance. (In the past, written Tahitian either did not distinguish vowel length, or used multiple other ways).
 Tongan and Samoan. The macron is called the toloi/fakamamafa or fa'amamafa, respectively. Its usage is similar to that in Māori, including its substitution by a trema. Its usage is not universal in Samoan, but recent academic publications and advanced study textbooks promote its use.
 The macron is used in Fijian language dictionaries, in instructional materials for non-Fijian speakers, and in books and papers on Fijian linguistics. It is not typically used in Fijian publications intended for fluent speakers, where context is usually sufficient for a reader to distinguish between heteronyms.
 Both Cyrillic and Latin transcriptions of Udege.
 The Latin and Cyrillic alphabet transcriptions of the Tsebari dialect of Tsez.
 In western Cree, Sauk, and Saulteaux, the Algonquianist Standard Roman Orthography (SRO) indicates long vowels  either with a circumflex ⟨â ê î ô⟩ or with a macron ⟨ā ē ī ō⟩.

Tone
The following languages or alphabets use the macron to mark tones:

 In the International Phonetic Alphabet, a macron over a vowel indicates a mid-level tone.
 In Yoruba an optional macron can be used to indicate mid-level tone if it would otherwise be ambiguous.
 In Pinyin, the official Romanization of Mandarin Chinese, macrons over a, e, i, o, u, ü (ā, ē, ī, ō, ū, ǖ) indicate the high level tone of Mandarin Chinese. The alternative to the macron is the number 1 after the syllable (for example, tā = ta1).
 Similarly in the Yale romanization of Cantonese, macrons over a, e, i, o, u, m, n (ā, ē, ī, ō, ū, m̄, n̄) indicate the high level tone of Cantonese. Like Mandarin, the alternative to the macron is the number 1 after the syllable (for example, tā = ta1).
 In Pe̍h-ōe-jī romanization of Hokkien, macrons over a, e, i, m, n, o, o͘, u, (ā, ē, ī, m̄, n̄, ō, ō͘, ū) indicate the mid level tone ("light departing" or 7th tone) of Hokkien.

Omission
Sometimes the macron marks an omitted n or m, like the tilde:
 In Old English texts a macron above a letter indicates the omission of an m or n that would normally follow that letter.
 In older handwriting such as the German Kurrentschrift, the macron over an a-e-i-o-u or ä-ö-ü stood for an n, or over an m or an n meant that the letter was doubled. This continued into print in English in the sixteenth century, and to some extent in German. Over a u at the end of a word, the macron indicated um as a form of scribal abbreviation.

Letter extension

In romanizations of Hebrew, the macron below is typically used to mark the begadkefat consonant lenition. However, for typographical reasons a regular macron is used on p and g instead: p̄, ḡ.

The macron is used in the orthography of a number of vernacular languages of the Solomon Islands and Vanuatu, particularly those first transcribed by Anglican missionaries. The macron has no unique value, and is simply used to distinguish between two different phonemes.

In Hiw orthography, the consonant r̄ stands for the prestopped velar lateral approximant .
In Araki, the same symbol r̄ encodes the alveolar trill  – by contrast with r, which encodes the alveolar flap .

In Bislama (orthography before 1995), Lamenu and Lewo, a macron is used on two letters . m̄ represents , and p̄ represents . The orthography after 1995 (which has no diacritics) has these written as mw and pw.

In Kokota, ḡ is used for the velar stop , but g without macron is the voiced velar fricative .

In Marshallese, a macron is used on four letters –  – whose pronunciations differ from the unmarked . Marshallese uses a vertical vowel system with three to four vowel phonemes, but traditionally their allophones have been written out, so vowel letters with macron are used for some of these allophones. Though the standard diacritic involved is a macron, there are no other diacritics used above letters, so in practice other diacritics can and have been used in less polished writing or print, yielding nonstandard letters like , depending on displayability of letters in computer fonts.
 The letter  is pronounced , the palatalized allophone of the phoneme .
 The letter  represents the velar nasal phoneme  and the labialized velar nasal phoneme , depending on context. The standard letter does not exist as a precombined glyph in Unicode, so the nonstandard variant  is often used in its place.
 The letter  is pronounced , the unrounded velarized allophone of the phoneme .

In Obolo, the simple n stands for the common alveolar nasal , while an n with macron (n̄) represents the velar nasal .

Other uses
 In older German and in the German Kurrent handwriting, as well as older Danish, a macron is used on some consonants, especially n and m, as a short form for a double consonant (for example, n̄ instead of nn).
  In Russian cursive, as well as in some others based on the Cyrillic script (for example, Bulgarian), a lowercase Т looks like a lowercase m, and a macron is often used to distinguish it from Ш, which looks like a lowercase w (see Т). Some writers also underline the letter ш to reduce ambiguity further.

Also, in some instances, a diacritic will be written like a macron, although it represents another diacritic whose standard form is different:

 In some Finnish, Estonian and Swedish comic books that are hand-lettered, or in handwriting, a macron-style umlaut is used for ä or ö (also õ and ü in Estonian), sometimes known colloquially as a "lazy man's umlaut". This can also be seen in some modern handwritten German.
 In Norwegian ū, ā, ī, ē and ō can be used for decorative purposes both in handwritten and computed Bokmål and Nynorsk or to denote vowel length such as in dū (you), lā (infinitive form of to let), lēser (present form of "to read") and lūft (air). The diacritic is entirely optional, carries no IPA value and is seldom used in modern Norwegian outside of handwriting.
 In informal Hungarian handwriting, a macron is often a substitute for either a double acute accent or an umlaut (e.g., ö or ő). Because of this ambiguity, using it is often regarded as bad practice.
 In informal handwriting, the Spanish ñ is sometimes written with a macron-shaped tilde: (n̄).

Medicine

Continuing previous Latin scribal abbreviations, letters with combining macron can be used in various European languages to represent the overlines indicating various medical abbreviations, particularly including:

Note, however, that abbreviations involving the letter h take their macron halfway up the ascending line rather than at the normal height for unicode macrons and overlines: ħ. This is separately encoded in Unicode with the symbols using bar diacritics and appears shorter than other macrons in many fonts.

Mathematics and science
The overline is a typographical symbol similar to the macron, used in a number of ways in mathematics and science. For example, it is used to represent complex conjugation:

and to represent a line segment in geometry (e.g.), sample means in statistics (e.g.) and negations in logic. It is also used in Hermann–Mauguin notation.

Music
In music, the tenuto marking resembles the macron.

The macron is also used in German lute tablature to distinguish repeating alphabetic characters.

Letters with macron

Technical notes

The Unicode Standard encodes combining and precomposed macron characters:

Macron-related Unicode characters not included in the table above:
 CJK fullwidth variety:
 
 Kazakhstani tenge
 
 Overlines
 Characters using a macron below instead of above
 Tone contour transcription characters incorporating a macron:
 
 
 
 
 Two intonation marks historically used by Antanas Baranauskas for Lithuanian dialectology:
 
 

In LaTeX a macron is created with the command "\=", for example: M\=aori for Māori.
In OpenOffice, if the extension Compose Special Characters is installed, a macron may be added by following the letter with a hyphen and pressing the user's predefined shortcut key for composing special characters. A macron may also be added by following the letter with the character's four-digit hex-code, and pressing the user's predefined shortcut key for adding unicode characters.

See also
 Macron below
 Vinculum (symbol)

References

External links
 Diacritics Project – All you need to design a font with correct accents
 Kupu o te Rā How to set up the keyboard to type macrons in various operating systems.

Latin-script diacritics
Greek-script diacritics
Cyrillic-script diacritics
Poetic rhythm